Frida Nilsson (born 1979) is a Swedish children’s writer whose first book was published in 2004. She has won numerous international shortlistings and prizes, including the August Prize, the German Youth Literature Prize and the Astrid Lindgren Prize. She was recently chosen as one of the best emerging writers in Europe under 39 (Hay Festival’s Aarhus 39, 2017). Nilsson’s writing is characterised by playfulness and sincerity. She has been compared to Roald Dahl and Barbro Lindgren.

Swedish bibliography
2017 – Det tunna svärdet (Natur & Kultur)
2015 – Ishavspirater (Natur & Kultur)
2014 – God jul, Lilla Lök (Rabén & Sjögren)
2013 – Jagger Jagger (Natur & Kultur)
2011 – Ryska kyssen (Rabén & Sjögren)
2009 – Hedvig och Hardemos prinsessa (Natur & Kultur)
2008 – Jag, Dante och miljonerna (Natur & Kultur)
2007 – Hedvig och sommaren med Steken (Natur & Kultur)
2006 – Hedvig och Max-Olov (Natur & Kultur)
2005 – Apstjärnan (Natur & Kultur)
2005 – Hedvig! (Natur & Kultur)
2004 – Kråkans otroliga liftarsemester (Natur & Kultur)

English translations
2017 – The Ice Sea Pirates (Gecko Press) 
2020 – Hattie (Gecko Press) 

2021 – Hattie and Olaf (Gecko Press)

Awards and accolades
2019 - Winner of the James Krüss Award for International Children's Literature  
2017 – Hay Festival Aarhus 39 selection
2016 – Winner of Expressen's Heffaklumpen Award for The Ice Sea Pirates
2016 – Winner of the Nils Holgersson Plaque for The Ice Sea Pirates
2016 – Winner of the BMF Plaque for The Ice Sea Pirates
2016 – White Ravens selection for The Ice Sea Pirates
2016 – Nordic Council Prize nomination for The Ice Sea Pirates
2015 – August Prize nomination for The Ice Sea Pirates
2015 – Nordic Council Prize nomination for Jagger Jagger
2014 – Astrid Lindgren Prize
2013 – Les Olympiades winner for Apstjärnan
2013 – Prix Tam-Tam "J'aime Lire" nomination for Apstjärnan
2013 – August Prize nomination for Jagger Jagger
2011 – Deutscher Jugendliteraturpreis nomination for Apstjärnan
2006 – August Prize nominee

References

External links
Frida Nilsson agency biography
Frida Nilsso publisher biography
Opening speech by Nilsson at the children and youth program of the International Literature Festival Berlin

1979 births
Living people
Swedish women writers